DJ Dan Peppe is a British record producer. In the mid to late '90s Peppe was a core member of the group, Agent Provocateur alongside John Gosling (of Psychic TV), Matthew Ashman (originally of Bow Wow Wow) Danny Saber (of Black Grape) and Cleo Torez. Peppe went on to record under the name Themroc. He was also a member of Jon Carter's electronica band Monkey Mafia.

In 2000 Peppe released his first material under the Themroc name, which is taken from the title of an avant garde French movie from 1972 by Claude Faraldo. His first two EPs were aimed squarely at the breakbeat scene and gained a warm reception in the clubs. However, Peppe adopted a more ambitious approach for his debut LP, Beyond These Things. The album's stylistic influences included electro, house, breakbeat, techno and ambient. Featuring the acclaimed hits 'Bloodline' and 'Gold Is Your Metal', the album was fêted by leading UK DJs including Trevor Jackson and Andrew Weatherall. The album was awarded Mixmag magazine's Essential Album by Pete Tong and the single 'Bloodline' featured in MTV's top 100 dance tracks of all time.

He has had productions feature on Wipeout Pure, CSI: New York, The Jackal.

in 2007 Peppe married the photographer Charlotte Macmillan.
In 2009 Peppe remixed the track Atlas by Battles. This remix was then used in a Honda commercial.

Alongside long-term collaborator John Collyer, Peppe composed a series of soundscapes for a ballet at the Royal Opera House in 2016. Other Stories featured Royal Ballet principal Ed Watson and former  New York City Ballet principal Wendy Whelan. The ballet featured a programme of five contemporary works created especially for the dancers by world acclaimed choreographers Annie-B Parson, Arlene Philips, Arthur Pita and Javier de Frutos.

References

Year of birth missing (living people)
Living people
British DJs
British record producers